General elections were held in Liechtenstein on 29 April 1945. Following the "silent elections" of 1939, they were the first to use the new proportional representation system. The Progressive Citizens' Party won eight of the 15 seats in the Landtag, but remained in coalition with the Patriotic Union.

Electoral system
Previously voters had chosen members of the Landtag by writing the names of as many candidates on the ballot paper as there were seats in their constituency. In the new system, parties put forward lists of candidates. The lists served as the ballot papers, with voters submitting their favoured list to the ballot box. Voters could also change the lists by crossing out names and adding others from other lists. After the number of seats a party had won was decided, the candidates who had received the most votes after the voter amendments were elected.

The threshold had been set at 18%, considered to be very high, primarily in order to prevent Nazi parties such as the German National Movement in Liechtenstein (VDBL) from gaining seats in the Landtag.

Results

By electoral district

Cultural depictions
The 1945 elections are depicted in the 1993 film Vent d'est, about a group of Russian collaborationist soldiers who sought asylum in Liechtenstein at the end of the war.

References

Liechtenstein
General
Elections in Liechtenstein
Liechtenstein